The Saturn MLV was a proposed concept family of rockets, intended as a follow-on to the Saturn V. MLV stands for "Modified Launch Vehicle".

Vehicle configurations representative of several alternative uprating methods were specified by the Marshall Space Flight Center for initial studies.

Proposed modifications  
 Thrust uprating and modifying of the five F-1 rocket engines used in the first S-IC stage, and corresponding increases in propellant tank capacities.
 Addition of a sixth F-1 engine in the S-IC stage, as an alternative to engine uprating, plus increased propellant capacities.
 Use of solid rocket motor boosters derived from the Titan IIIC vehicle.
 Additional J-2 engines in the S-II stage, ~131 s increased upper stage propellant capacities.
 Improved or advanced upper stage engines, such as the HG-3, plus increased propellant capacities.

The baseline Saturn MLV would incorporate these changes from the Saturn V vehicle.
Saturn IC (first stage) stretched 240 inches with 5.6 million pounds propellant and five new F-1A engines; 
S-II (second stage) stretched 41 inches with 1.0 million pounds propellant and five J-2 engines; 
S-IVB (third stage) strengthened, but with standard 230,000 lbs propellant, one J-2 engine.

References
 "Modified Launch Vehicle (MLV) Saturn V Improvement Study Composite Summary Report", NASA Marshall Space Flight Center (MSFC), July 1965, 76 pages.  Improved Saturn V configurations studied under contract NAS8-11359.

External links
astronautix.com

Apollo program
MLV